Thurs may refer to:

 Thurs, an entity from Germanic mythology. See Jötunn.
 Thurisaz (rune) ᚦ
 An abbreviation for Thursday 
 Thurs, a math-statistical function

ru:Турсы